Greenwood Mountain is the name of several mountain summits in the United States.

The state of Maine has two peaks:

The state of Minnesota has also one peak:
 Lake County, Minnesota.

The state of Texas has also one peak: 
 Burnet County in the state of Texas.

The state of West Virginia has also two peaks:  

Notes

Mountains of Maine
Mountains of Minnesota
Mountains of Texas
Mountains of West Virginia